A tidal strait is a strait connecting two oceans or seas through which a tidal current flows. Tidal currents are usually unidirectional but sometimes are bidirectional. Tidal straits, though they are narrow seaways, are technically not rivers. They are frequently of tectonic origin. In them, currents develop because of elevation differences between the water basins at both ends.

Tides sometimes allow sediments to collect in  tidal straits.

See also

 Sediment trap (geology)
 Tidal circularization

References

External links
 A facies‐based depositional model for ancient and modern, tectonically–confined tidal straits
 Deltas sourcing tidal straits: observations from some field case studies
 Notes on shipwrecks in the Arthur Kill ship graveyard

Oceanography